The Verde River Bridge near Paulden, Arizona, was built in 1922.  It was listed on the National Register of Historic Places in 1988.

It is a filled spandrel arch bridge with a  span.

It is located on Sullivan Lake Rd., what is now labelled on maps as N. Old Highway 89., about half a mile from the current crossing of Verde River by Arizona State Route 89.

See also
 Perkinsville Bridge, also spanning Verde River, also NRHP-listed
 Verde River Sheep Bridge, also NRHP-listed

References

Road bridges on the National Register of Historic Places in Arizona
Bridges completed in 1922
Buildings and structures in Yavapai County, Arizona
1922 establishments in Arizona
National Register of Historic Places in Yavapai County, Arizona